The Borgias is a British television drama serial produced by the BBC in 1981, in association with the Second Network of the Italian broadcaster RAI. The series, produced by Mark Shivas, was set in Italy during the 15th century and told the story of Rodrigo Borgia (played by Adolfo Celi) – the future Pope Alexander VI – and his family, including his son Cesare (Oliver Cotton) and daughter Lucrezia (Anne Louise Lambert).

The 10 episodes follow events from 1492 when Rodrigo is elected pope and concludes in 1507 with Cesare's violent death.

Reception
Intended to be a gripping historical melodrama in the same vein as the earlier BBC series, I, Claudius, and despite credible locations and excellent cinematography, the series was not a critical success. The BBC screened the series at the same time as ITV's lavish Brideshead Revisited, and critics contrasted the high production values and stellar cast of Brideshead with The Borgias seeming focus on frequent graphic violence and nudity.

The Sicilian-born actor Adolfo Celi, well known to have a heavy Sicilian accent, is said to have had much difficulty enunciating his lines. His thickly-accented English proved difficult for viewers to follow.

The series was released on DVD in the UK by 2 Entertain in 2016.

Cast

See also
The Cleopatras

External links
 

1980s British drama television series
1981 British television series debuts
1981 British television series endings
BBC television dramas
British historical television series
House of Borgia
Television series set in the Renaissance
Television series set in the 15th century
Television series set in the 16th century
Television shows set in Italy
Television shows set in Vatican City
Films about popes
Cultural depictions of Cesare Borgia
Cultural depictions of Lucrezia Borgia
Cultural depictions of Pope Alexander VI
English-language television shows